Slovenia has participated in the Eurovision Song Contest 27 times since its debut in , having hosted a qualification round (Kvalifikacija za Millstreet) in Ljubljana for seven countries due to the influx of new nations wishing to join the Eurovision Song Contest.

History

Early participation 
After the fall of Communism across Europe in the early 1990s and the Dissolution of Yugoslavia, newly independent Slovenia was one of seven countries that had emerged from the Eastern Bloc wishing to join the Eurovision Song Contest. Due to the influx of new countries wishing to participate, the European Broadcasting Union introduced a pre-qualifying round for countries that had either never participated in the contest at all, or in the case of former republics of Yugoslavia, had not previously competed as nations in their own right. This was, however, merely a 'sticking-plaster' measure that was plainly not a sustainable solution for future years, as it would not be seen as remotely equitable. But in the meantime, Croatia, Bosnia and Herzegovina, Hungary, Slovakia, Romania, Estonia and Slovenia were left to battle it out in a qualification round. The EBU selected Radiotelevizija Slovenija to host the event in Ljubljana. Held on 3 April 1993 at the RTVSLO studios, Slovenia was one of three countries to qualify, finishing in first place with "Tih deževen dan" performed by 1X Band. The band were previously selected to represent Slovenia through RTVSLO's national selection Slovenski izbor za Pesem Evrovizije 1993. At the contest, Slovenia's debut fared reasonably poorly finishing in a mere 22nd place with just 9 points. Due to the poor result, Slovenia was relegated from the 1994 contest and had to wait until 1995 to enter again. For their return in 1995, RTVSLO organised the same national selection process as 1993 to determine their entry. Slovenski izbor za Pesem Evrovizije 1995 resulted in the selection of Darja Švajger with "Prisluhni mi". Švajger achieved Slovenia's best result to date at the contest, reaching an impressive seventh place including ten points from Greece and the United Kingdom. In 1996, Radiotelevizija Slovenija introduced Slovenia's long-running national final EMA. This selection process was used every year until the country was relegated for a second time in  due to a poor average score. Slovenia returned in 2001, using the EMA format again. 2001 marked the second time Slovenia achieved seventh place with Nuša Derenda and "Energy". This remains the country's most recent top ten result to date.

2004–2010
In 2004, the EBU introduced a semi-final round in order to control the number of countries entering the contest every year. Due to not placing in the top ten the previous year, Slovenia was forced to compete in the semi-final round for the 2004 contest. After winning the national final EMA 2004, the country was represented by the duo Platin with the song "Stay Forever". The performance proved to be disastrous with Slovenia only receiving five points placing 21st out of 22, hence failing to qualify for the final. The following two years also saw Slovenia absent from the Eurovision final, with Omar Naber and Anžej Dežan both failing to qualify for the final. By 2007, Slovenia was one of only five countries that had not made an appearance in the final since 2003. EMA 2007 resulted in the victory of Alenka Gotar with her operatic pop song "Cvet z juga". This became the first ever Slovene entry to qualify for the Eurovision final, placing seventh in the semi-final with 140 points. In Slovenia's first Eurovision final appearance since 2003, Alenka Gotar reached a respectable fifteenth place with 66 points. In the three following years, Rebeka Dremelj, Quartissimo feat. Martina Majerle and Ansambel Žlindra and Kalamari all failed to qualify for the final, with the latter only receiving six points in the 2010 semi-final.

2011–2013

2011 saw a change in Slovenia's luck at the Eurovision Song Contest, qualifying for the final for the first time since 2007. Following her victory at the Slovene national final EMA 2011, Maja Keuc represented the nation with "No One". Participating in the second semi-final, Maja fared extremely well, placing first with the juries with 146 points and seventh in the public televote with 68 points. This meant that Slovenia qualified to the final in an impressive third place. In the final, Maja achieved the country's best result since , placing thirteenth with 96 points. It was later revealed that the juries placed Slovenia in fourth place with 160 points, while the public placed the entry 22nd with 39 points. Maja's song remains a fan favourite today, with the Slovenian public voting it as the nation's best ever Eurovision entry in a 2020 poll.

Due to the success in 2011, Radiotelevizija Slovenija introduced a large scale national final for the 2012 contest in Baku, Azerbaijan. Misija Evrovizija was a five month long selection process that took place between August 2011 and January 2012, which resulted in the selection of two singers to advance to Misija EMA 2012 (phase two of the selection). Ultimately, Eva Boto was selected to represent the country with "Verjamem". Boto failed to qualify for the final, finishing in 17th place only ahead of Slovakia. RTV Slovenija confirmed Slovenia's participation in the 2013 Eurovision Song Contest on 15 December 2012 after speculation that a withdrawal was being considered. The Slovenian entry for the Eurovision Song Contest has traditionally been selected through a national final entitled Evrovizijska Melodija (EMA), which has been produced with variable formats. For 2013, the broadcaster opted to forego the use of this national final in order to internally select the Slovenian entry due to time constraints and reduced funding. RTVSLO selected Slovene-American singer Hannah Mancini with "Straight into Love". The entry finished in last place in the first semi-final with just 8 points, marking the first time that Slovenia has finished in last place in a Eurovision event.

Recent participation

For 2014, RTVSLO confirmed that they would organise EMA 2014 after being the last country to confirm participation despite more speculations over a potential withdrawal. The winner of the eighteenth edition of EMA was Tinkara Kovač with "Round and Round". Kovač reached the final marking Slovenia's first final appearance since 2011. The country finished in 25th place with 9 points (8 from Montenegro and 1 from Macedonia). For the 2015 contest, Slovenia was represented by Maraaya with "Here for You". The duo qualified for the final in 5th place, including twelve points from Azerbaijan and Montenegro. In the final, Slovenia finished in 14th position with 39 points - the country's best result since 2011. Following the contest, "Here for You" went on to enter the 'Top 50 Charts' in Slovenia, Austria, Slovakia, Finland and Belgium.

For the following two years, Slovenia was absent from the final with ManuElla and Omar Naber failing to qualify. However, in both 2018 and 2019 Slovenia qualified for the final twice in a row once again. Lea Sirk reached 22nd with "Hvala, ne!" and Zala Kralj & Gašper Šantl achieved fifteenth place with 105 points - the most points ever scored by Slovenia in a Eurovision final. The successful result in 2019 provoked RTVSLO to expand their national final format. In 2020, EMA FREŠ was introduced as a pre-selection for the main EMA competition. The selection gives new and upcoming Slovenian artists a chance to promote themselves and fight for a place in EMA. Having won EMA 2020, Ana Soklič was due to represent Slovenia in the Eurovision Song Contest 2020 with "Voda". However, after the contest was cancelled due to the COVID-19 pandemic, RTVSLO internally selected her to represent Slovenia in 2021 with "Amen". She failed to qualify for the final, finishing in 13th place with 44 points.

On 8 October 2021, Radiotelevizija Slovenija confirmed that both EMA FREŠ and EMA would return for the Slovenian selection for the Eurovision Song Contest 2022, with a revamped format from the first edition. On 19 February 2022, after a three month long process, it was determined that LPS would represent Slovenia at the Eurovision Song Contest 2022 in Turin, Italy. At the contest, LPS finished last with 15 points and failed to qualify from the first semi-final, lengthening Slovenia's absence from the final. It was later revealed that the band finished last in their semi-final, marking Slovenia's worst result at the contest in ten years. Following the poor result in 2022, RTVSLO considered withdrawing from the Eurovision Song Contest in 2023. However, after discussions with the Music Commission of the Programme Council, the broadcaster opted against a withdrawal, and confirmed its participation in the 2023 contest, to be held in Liverpool, on 15 September 2022. After the poor result in 2022, RTVSLO decided to change the selection format for the Slovenian entry, deciding to internally choose their act for only the third time. On 8 December 2022, RTVSLO revealed that they had selected Joker Out to represent Slovenia in Liverpool, with their song "" released on 4 February 2023, during a special presentation show 'Misija Liverpool' that celebrated 30 years of Slovenian participation in the Eurovision Song Contest.

Participation overview 

Trivia

Songs by language

Selection process

Related involvement

Heads of delegation
The public broadcaster of each participating country in the Eurovision Song Contest assigns a head of delegation as the EBU's contact person and the leader of their delegation at the event. The delegation, whose size can greatly vary, includes a head of press, the contestants, songwriters, composers and backing vocalists, among others.

Jury members
A five-member jury panel consisting of music industry professionals is made up for every participating country for the semi-finals and final of the Eurovision Song Contest, ranking all entries except for their own country's contribution. The juries' votes constitute 50% of the overall result alongside televoting.

Hostings 
Slovenia has never hosted the Eurovision Song Contest, while the European Broadcasting Union did select RTVSLO to host the qualification round for the 1993 contest in Ljubljana.

Kvalifikacija za Millstreet

Conductors
Between 1993 and 1998, Slovenia sent a native conductor to the contest every year the country took part until the orchestra was dropped by the EBU in 1999.

Commentators and spokespersons
For the show's broadcast on RTVSLO, various commentators have provided commentary on the contest in the Slovene language. At the Eurovision Song Contest after all points are calculated, the presenters of the show call upon each voting country to invite each respective spokesperson to announce the results of their vote on-screen. From 2014 to 2022, RTVSLO has arranged radio broadcast on the contest.

Other shows

Photogallery

See also 
 Slovenia in the Eurovision Young Musicians
 Slovenia in the Junior Eurovision Song Contest
 Slovenia in the Eurovision Young Dancers
 Slovenia in Eurovision Choir

Notes

References 

 
Countries in the Eurovision Song Contest